Lara or Laura González may refer to:

 Lara González (rhythmic gymnast) (born 1986), Spanish Olympic rhythmic gymnast
 Laura González (rugby union) (born 1993), Colombian rugby sevens player
 Laura González (Miss Colombia) (born 1995), Colombian model and actress

See also 
 Lara González Ortega (born 1992), Spanish handball player
 Lara Gonzalez (School Rumble), a character in School Rumble